Copient Technologies is part of NCR Corporation and specializes in retail marketing technologies.  Founded in 1999 by Bret Besecker and Eric Davis, it was headquartered in the Purdue Research Park in West Lafayette, Indiana, and was an independent company until its acquisition in April 2003 by Atlanta-based NCR.  The West Lafayette office closed on 1 October 2013.

Copient's main software product was Logix, an offer-management application for high-volume retailers that's now part of NCR's Advanced Marketing Solution.

External links
NCR Advanced Marketing Solution
Copient Technologies

References

 

Companies based in Indiana
West Lafayette, Indiana
NCR Corporation
2003 mergers and acquisitions